Cecelia Wolstenholme (18 May 1915 – 25 October 1968), later known by her married name Cecelia Thornton, was an English competitive swimmer who represented Great Britain in the Olympic Games and European championships, and England in the British Empire Games.  She won the 200 yd breaststroke at the 1930 British Empire Games and the 200 m breaststroke at the 1931 European Championships, beating Jenny Kastein. She competed in the latter event at the 1932 Summer Olympics, but failed to reach the final. Her younger sister Beatrice was also an international swimmer.

References

External links 
 

1915 births
1968 deaths
English female swimmers
Female breaststroke swimmers
Olympic swimmers of Great Britain
Swimmers at the 1932 Summer Olympics
Swimmers at the 1930 British Empire Games
Commonwealth Games gold medallists for England
People from Withington
European Aquatics Championships medalists in swimming
Commonwealth Games medallists in swimming
Medallists at the 1930 British Empire Games